Michael Farrell (born 1944) is an Irish civil rights activist, writer and former leader of People's Democracy, from its inception through to the 1969 Burntollet Bridge incident and into the 1970s.

Farrell was educated at Queen's University, Belfast and the University of Strathclyde.  He was a Labour Trotskyist, becoming involved in the Northern Ireland civil rights movement in Northern Ireland in the late 1960s, and was a founding member of the university-based People’s Democracy, which was established on 9 October 1968, after Royal Ulster Constabulary police had broken up a civil rights march in Derry on 5 October.  He stood as their candidate for Bannside in the Northern Ireland general election of 1969 where he finished third behind Terence O'Neill (the Northern Ireland Prime Minister) and Ian Paisley. He was on the executive of the Northern Ireland Civil Rights Association and was interned without trial for six weeks from 9 August 1971.  Imprisoned for breach of the peace in 1973, Farrell and another PD member, Tony Canavan, went on hunger strike in demand of political status.  The strike lasted for thirty-four days before they were released.

In the 1980s he campaigned for the release of victims of miscarriage of justice cases in England and in the Republic of Ireland, including the Birmingham Six. He also campaigned against political censorship under Section 31 of the Broadcasting Act in Ireland.

After moving to Dublin and becoming a solicitor, Farrell was co-chairperson of the Irish Council for Civil Liberties from 1995 to 2001. He was appointed a member of the Irish Human Rights Commission in 2001 and reappointed in October 2006, serving until 2011. In 2005 he was appointed to the Steering Committee of the National Action Plan Against Racism. He is currently working for Free Legal Advice Centres, Dublin, and has brought cases to the European Court of Human Rights and the UN Human Rights Committee. In 2011 he was appointed to the European Commission against Racism and Intolerance, and in 2012 he was appointed to the Irish Council of State by President Michael D. Higgins.

He has two children: Sean and Eimear.

Published works
 (books.google.com.au)
 The Magill Book of Irish Politics (1981) 
 Arming the Protestants (1983) 
 Sheltering the Fugitive (1986) 
 Emergency Legislation: Apparatus of Repression (1986) 
 Twenty Years On (1988) (editor)

References

1944 births
Living people
Alumni of Queen's University Belfast
Alumni of the University of Strathclyde
Civil rights activists from Northern Ireland
Human rights activists from Northern Ireland
Irish Trotskyists
Irish Marxist historians
Marxist writers from Northern Ireland
People from County Londonderry
Presidential appointees to the Council of State (Ireland)